Jindong-myeon is a myeon (township) under the administration of Paju, Gyeonggi Province, South Korea. , it administers the following five villages:
Dongpa-ri
Seogok-ri
Yongsan-ri
Cho-ri
Hapo-ri

References 

Towns and townships in Gyeonggi Province
Paju